The great argus (Argusianus argus) is a species of pheasant from Southeast Asia.

It is not to be confused with the two species of closely related crested argus, genus Rheinardia.

Taxonomy
 
Carl Linnaeus gave the great argus its specific name (from which its common name and genus name are derived) because of the intricate eye-like patterns on its wings, in reference to Argus, a hundred-eyed giant in Greek mythology. There are two subspecies recognized: Nominate argus of the Malay peninsula and Sumatra, and A. a. grayi of Borneo. William Beebe considered the two races to be distinct species, but they have since been lumped.

Double-banded argus
The double-banded argus (Argusianus bipunctatus), known only from a portion of a single primary flight feather, was long considered a potential second species. It was described in 1871 from this feather piece, found in a millinery shipment imported to London. Its origin was hypothesized to be from Java, Indonesia or Tioman Island of Malaysia, because of the great argus's absence from these locations. Parkes (1992) rejected the double-banded argus's validity and argued that it almost certainly represents a mutant form of the great argus. The IUCN, following the precautionary principle, listed this taxon as extinct until 2012. It was removed from the IUCN Red list because the IOC had removed this species from its list of valid bird taxa in 2011. While the feather is indeed quite distinct, it represents a fairly simple divergence: The entirely asymmetrically-patterned vanes are instead near-symmetrical, and both bear the darker brown shaftward area with dense whitish speckles. The shaft is thinner than usual and the feather would probably not have been useful for flight.

Nothing similar has come to notice ever since, and as the feather piece is not a composite of two feather halves glued together but an apparently natural specimen, a hoax or fake can be ruled out. Despite all conjecture that has been built around the feather piece, all that can be said is that at some time around 1870, an argus pheasant which bore at least one such feather was shot in an unknown location. Even if this individual was one of the last remnants of a now-extinct population, it is unlikely that only a single feather would have been taken from an unusual specimen of a well-known, often-hunted, and conspicuous bird, and that this single feather would have then been bundled into a shipment of normal great argus feathers. The feather is now housed in the Natural History Museum in London.

Names
 Malay language: Kuang raya "great pheasant"

Description 

The great argus is a brown-plumaged pheasant with a blue head and neck, rufous red upper breast, black hair-like feathers on the crown and nape, and red legs.

Unusual among Galliformes, the great argus has no uropygial gland.

Male and female plumage 
Males have very long tail feathers and huge, broad and greatly elongated secondary wing feathers decorated with large eyespots. Young males develop their adult plumage in their third year.

Females are smaller and duller than males, with shorter tails and fewer eyespots.

Behaviour

Diet 
It feeds on the forest floor in early morning and evening.

Mating dance 

The male clears an open spot in the forest and prepares a dancing ground. He announces himself with loud calls to attract females, then he dances before her with his wings spread into two enormous fans, revealing hundreds of "eyes" while his real eyes are hidden behind it, staring at her.

Breeding 
Despite displays similar to polygamous birds and though the great argus was thought to be polygamous in the wild, it has been discovered that it is actually monogamous. The hen lays only two eggs.

Distribution and habitat
The great argus is native to the jungles of Borneo, Sumatra and the Malay Peninsula in southeast Asia.

Conservation
Due to ongoing habitat loss and to being hunted in some areas, the great argus is evaluated as Vulnerable on the IUCN Red List. It is listed on Appendix II of CITES.

References

Further reading

External links 

 ARKive – images and movies of the Great Argus (Argusianus argus)
 BirdLife Species Factsheet
 Red Data Book

great argus
great argus
Birds of Malesia
great argus
great argus